Ametastegia pallipes, the violet sawfly, is a species of common sawfly in the family Tenthredinidae. It is found in Europe.

References

Tenthredinidae
Articles created by Qbugbot